Adriano Zamboni (22 June 1933 – 13 May 2005) was an Italian racing cyclist. He won stage 16 of the 1961 Giro d'Italia.

References

External links
 

1933 births
2005 deaths
Italian male cyclists
Italian Giro d'Italia stage winners
Sportspeople from Verona
Cyclists from the Province of Verona